Nièvre is a department in central France.

Nièvre may also refer to:

Nièvre (Loire), a river in central France, tributary of the Loire
Nièvre (Somme), a river in northern France, tributary of the Somme